Natasha Lehrer is a writer and literary translator. She was born in London and studied at Oxford University and the Université de Paris VIII. Her translations have received multiple awards, and been longlisted and shortlisted for several prizes. She was the joint winner (with Cecile Menon) of the 2016 Scott Moncrieff Prize for their translation of Nathalie Léger's Suite for Barbara Loden. Her writing has appeared in The Guardian, The Observer, the Times Literary Supplement, The Nation, Haaretz, Frieze Magazine, Fantastic Man, The Paris Review, among other publications. She is a former judge of the Jewish Quarterly-Wingate Prize.

Her translations include:
 2022 – Our Unexpected Brothers, by Amin Maalouf (World Editions)
 2022 – Absence, by Lucie Paye (Les Fugitives)
 2022 – The Vanished Collection, by Pauline Baer de Perignon (New Vessel Press)
 2021 – Consent, by Vanessa Springora (HarperCollins)
 2020 – I Hate Men, by Pauline Harmange (4th Estate)
 2020 – Villa of Delirium, by Adrien Goetz (New Vessel Press)
 2020 – The Last Days of Ellis Island, by Gaëlle Josse (World Editions)
 2020 – The Sailor of Casablanca, by Charline Malaval (Hodder and Stoughton)
 2020 – The Most Beautiful Job in the World, by Giulia Mensitieri (Bloomsbury Publishing)
 2020 – The White Dress, by Nathalie Léger (Les Fugitives/Dorothy, a publishing project)
 2019 – Memories of Low Tide, by Chantal Thomas (Pushkin Press)
 2019 – The Chinese Intelligence Services, from Mao Zedong to Xi Jinping, by Roger Faligot (Hurst/OUP)
 2019 – Doves Among Hawks: Struggles of the Israeli Peace Movement, by Samy Cohen (Hurst/OUP) (with Cynthia Schoch)
 2018 – The Survival of the Jews in France, by Jacques Semelin (Hurst/OUP) (with Cynthia Schoch)
 2018 – A Call for Revolution, by the Dalai Lama (Penguin Random House) (with Georgia de Chamberet)
 2018 – The Sacred Conspiracy, by Georges Bataille et al (Atlas Press)
 2017 – The Punishments of Hell, by Robert Desnos (Atlas Press)
 2016 – Equipée: Journey to the Land of the Real, by Victor Segalen (Atlas Press)
 2015 – Suite for Barbara Loden, by Nathalie Léger (Les Fugitives/Dorothy, a publishing project) (with Cécile Menon)

She lives in Paris with her husband and three children.

References

External links
 Interview for the 2017 French-American Foundation Translation Prize
 Interview with Bloom (The Millions)
 Interview on Bookblast
 Interview on Lucy Writers
 Podcast interview with Lucy Popescu

English translators
Year of birth missing (living people)
Living people